This is a list of bird species confirmed in the Canadian province of Alberta. Unless otherwise noted, the list is that of Bird Checklists of the World as of June 2021. Of the 445 species on the list, 135 are accidental and nine were introduced to North America. One species is extinct and another probably is.

This list is presented in the taxonomic sequence of the Check-list of North and Middle American Birds, 7th edition through the 62nd Supplement, published by the American Ornithological Society (AOS). Common and scientific names are also those of the Check-list, except that Canadian English spellings are used and the common names of families are from the Clements taxonomy because the AOS list does not include them.

The following tags are used to describe some categories of occurrence.

(A) Accidental - a species that rarely or accidentally occurs in Alberta
(I) Introduced - a species that has been introduced to Alberta by the actions of humans, either directly or indirectly

Ducks, geese, and waterfowl
Order: AnseriformesFamily: Anatidae

Anatidae includes the ducks and most duck-like waterfowl, such as geese and swans. These birds are adapted to an aquatic existence with webbed feet, bills which are flattened to a greater or lesser extent, and feathers that are excellent at shedding water due to special oils.

Fulvous whistling-duck, Dendrocygna bicolor (A)
Snow goose, Anser caerulescens
Ross's goose, Anser rossii
Greater white-fronted goose, Anser albifrons
Tundra bean-goose, Anser serrirostris (A)
Brant, Branta bernicla (A)
Cackling goose, Branta hutchinsii
Canada goose, Branta canadensis
Trumpeter swan, Cygnus buccinator
Tundra swan, Cygnus columbianus
Wood duck, Aix sponsa
Baikal teal, Sibirionetta formosa (A)
Garganey, Spatula querquedula (A)
Blue-winged teal, Spatula discors
Cinnamon teal, Spatula cyanoptera
Northern shoveler, Spatula clypeata
Gadwall, Mareca strepera
Eurasian wigeon, Mareca penelope
American wigeon, Mareca americana
Mallard, Anas platyrhynchos
American black duck, Anas rubripes (A)
Northern pintail, Anas acuta
Green-winged teal, Anas crecca
Canvasback, Aythya valisineria
Redhead, Aythya americana
Ring-necked duck, Aythya collaris
Tufted duck, Aythya fuligula (A)
Greater scaup, Aythya marila
Lesser scaup, Aythya affinis
King eider, Somateria spectabilis (A)
Common eider, Somateria mollissima (A)
Harlequin duck, Histrionicus histrionicus
Surf scoter, Melanitta perspicillata
White-winged scoter, Melanitta deglandi
Black scoter, Melanitta americana (A)
Long-tailed duck, Clangula hyemalis
Bufflehead, Bucephala albeola
Common goldeneye, Bucephala clangula
Barrow's goldeneye, Bucephala islandica
Hooded merganser, Lophodytes cucullatus
Common merganser, Mergus merganser
Red-breasted merganser, Mergus serrator
Ruddy duck, Oxyura jamaicensis

Pheasants, grouse, and allies
Order: GalliformesFamily: Phasianidae

Phasianidae consists of the pheasants and their allies. These are terrestrial species, variable in size but generally plump with broad relatively short wings. Many species are gamebirds or have been domesticated as a food source for humans.

Wild turkey, Meleagris gallopavo (I)
Ruffed grouse, Bonasa umbellus
Greater sage-grouse, Centrocercus urophasianus
Spruce grouse, Canachites canadensis
Willow ptarmigan, Lagopus lagopus
Rock ptarmigan, Lagopus mutus (A)
White-tailed ptarmigan, Lagopus leucurus
Dusky grouse, Dendragapus obscurus
Sharp-tailed grouse, Tympanuchus phasianellus
Greater prairie-chicken, Tympanuchus cupido (A) (possibly extirpated)
Grey partridge, Perdix perdix (I)
Ring-necked pheasant, Phasianus colchicus (I)

Grebes
Order: PodicipediformesFamily: Podicipedidae

Grebes are small to medium-large freshwater diving birds. They have lobed toes and are excellent swimmers and divers. However, they have their feet placed far back on the body, making them quite ungainly on land.

Pied-billed grebe, Podilymbus podiceps
Horned grebe, Podiceps auritus
Red-necked grebe, Podiceps grisegena
Eared grebe, Podiceps nigricollis
Western grebe, Aechmorphorus occidentalis
Clark's grebe, Aechmorphorus clarkii

Pigeons and doves
Order: ColumbiformesFamily: Columbidae

Pigeons and doves are stout-bodied birds with short necks and short slender bills with a fleshy cere.

Rock pigeon, Columba livia (I)
Band-tailed pigeon, Patagioenas fasciata (A)
Eurasian collared-dove, Streptopelia decaocto (I)
Passenger pigeon, Ectopistes migratorius (Extinct)
White-winged dove, Zenaida asiatica (A)
Mourning dove, Zenaida macroura

Cuckoos
Order: CuculiformesFamily: Cuculidae

The family Cuculidae includes cuckoos, roadrunners, and anis. These birds are of variable size with slender bodies, long tails, and strong legs.

Yellow-billed cuckoo, Coccyzus americanus (A)
Black-billed cuckoo, Coccyzus erythropthalmus

Nightjars and allies
Order: CaprimulgiformesFamily: Caprimulgidae

Nightjars are medium-sized nocturnal birds that usually nest on the ground. They have long wings, short legs, and very short bills. Most have small feet, of little use for walking, and long pointed wings. Their soft plumage is cryptically coloured to resemble bark or leaves.

Common nighthawk,  Chordeiles minor
Common poorwill,  Phalaenoptilus nuttallii
Eastern whip-poor-will, Antrostomus vociferus (A)

Swifts
Order: ApodiformesFamily: Apodidae

The swifts are small birds which spend the majority of their lives flying. These birds have very short legs and never settle voluntarily on the ground, perching instead only on vertical surfaces. Many swifts have long swept-back wings which resemble a crescent or boomerang.

Black swift, Cypseloides niger
Chimney swift, Chaetura pelagica (A)
Vaux's swift, Chaetura vauxi
White-throated swift, Aeronautes saxatalis (A)

Hummingbirds
Order: ApodiformesFamily: Trochilidae

Hummingbirds are small birds capable of hovering in mid-air due to the rapid flapping of their wings. They are the only birds that can fly backwards.

Mexican violetear, Colibri thalassinus (A)
Ruby-throated hummingbird, Archilochus colubris
Black-chinned hummingbird, Archilochus alexandri (A)
Anna's hummingbird, Calypte anna (A)
Costa's hummingbird, Calypte costae (A)
Calliope hummingbird, Selasphorus calliope
Rufous hummingbird, Selasphorus rufus
Broad-tailed hummingbird, Selasphorus platycercus (A)
Broad-billed hummingbird, Cynanthus latirostris (A)

Rails, gallinules, and coots
Order: GruiformesFamily: Rallidae

Rallidae is a large family of small to medium-sized birds which includes the rails, crakes, coots, and gallinules. The most typical family members occupy dense vegetation in damp environments near lakes, swamps, or rivers. In general they are shy and secretive birds, making them difficult to observe. Most species have strong legs and long toes which are well adapted to soft uneven surfaces. They tend to have short, rounded wings and to be weak fliers.

Virginia rail, Rallus limicola
Sora, Porzana carolina
Common gallinule, Gallinula galeata (A)
American coot, Fulica americana
Yellow rail, Coturnicops noveboracensis

Cranes
Order: GruiformesFamily: Gruidae

Cranes are large, long-legged, and long-necked birds. Unlike the similar-looking but unrelated herons, cranes fly with necks outstretched, not pulled back. Most have elaborate and noisy courting displays or "dances".

Sandhill crane, Antigone canadensis
Common crane, Grus grus (A)
Whooping crane, Grus americana

Stilts and avocets
Order: CharadriiformesFamily: Recurvirostridae

Recurvirostridae is a family of large wading birds which includes the avocets and stilts. The avocets have long legs and long up-curved bills. The stilts have extremely long legs and long, thin, straight bills.

Black-necked stilt, Himantopus mexicanus
American avocet, Recurvirostra americana

Plovers and lapwings
Order: CharadriiformesFamily: Charadriidae

The family Charadriidae includes the plovers, dotterels, and lapwings. They are small to medium-sized birds with compact bodies, short thick necks, and long, usually pointed, wings. They are found in open country worldwide, mostly in habitats near water.

Black-bellied plover, Pluvialis squatarola
American golden-plover, Pluvialis dominica
Pacific golden-plover, Pluvialis fulva (A)
Killdeer, Charadrius vociferus
Semipalmated plover, Charadrius semipalmatus
Piping plover, Charadrius melodus
Lesser sand-plover, Charadrius mongolus (A)
Snowy plover, Charadrius nivosus (A)
Mountain plover, Charadrius montanus (A)

Sandpipers and allies
Order: CharadriiformesFamily: Scolopacidae

Scolopacidae is a large diverse family of small to medium-sized shorebirds including the sandpipers, curlews, godwits, shanks, tattlers, woodcocks, snipes, dowitchers, and phalaropes. The majority of these species eat small invertebrates picked out of the mud or soil. Different lengths of legs and bills enable multiple species to feed in the same habitat, particularly on the coast, without direct competition for food.

Upland sandpiper, Bartramia longicauda
Whimbrel, Numenius phaeopus
Eskimo curlew, Numenius borealis (probably extinct)
Long-billed curlew, Numenius americanus
Bar-tailed godwit, Limosa haemastica (A)
Hudsonian godwit, Limosa haemastica
Marbled godwit, Limosa fedoa
Ruddy turnstone, Arenaria interpres
Black turnstone, Arenaria melanocephala (A)
Red knot, Calidris canutus
Surfbird, Calidris virgata (A)
Ruff, Calidris pugnax (A)
Sharp-tailed sandpiper, Calidris acuminata (A)
Stilt sandpiper, Calidris himantopus
Curlew sandpiper, Calidris ferruginea (A)
Spoon-billed sandpiper, Calidris pygmea (A)
Red-necked stint, Calidris ruficollis (A)
Sanderling, Calidris alba
Dunlin, Calidris alpina
Purple sandpiper, Calidris maritima (A)
Baird's sandpiper, Calidris bairdii
Little stint, Calidris minuta (A)
Least sandpiper, Calidris minutilla
White-rumped sandpiper, Calidris fuscicollis
Buff-breasted sandpiper, Calidris subruficollis
Pectoral sandpiper, Calidris melanotos
Semipalmated sandpiper, Calidris pusilla
Western sandpiper, Calidris mauri (A)
Short-billed dowitcher, Limnodromus griseus
Long-billed dowitcher, Limnodromus scolopaceus
American woodcock, Scolopax minor (A)
Wilson's snipe, Gallinago delicata
Spotted sandpiper, Actitis macularia
Solitary sandpiper, Tringa solitaria
Wandering tattler, Tringa incana (A)
Lesser yellowlegs, Tringa flavipes
Willet, Tringa semipalmata
Spotted redshank, Tringa erythropus (A)
Greater yellowlegs, Tringa melanoleuca
Wilson's phalarope, Phalaropus tricolor
Red-necked phalarope, Phalaropus lobatus
Red phalarope, Phalaropus fulicarius (A)

Skuas and jaegers
Order: CharadriiformesFamily: Stercorariidae

Jaegers are in general medium to large birds, typically with grey or brown plumage, often with white markings on the wings. They have longish bills with hooked tips and webbed feet with sharp claws. They look like large dark gulls, but have a fleshy cere above the upper mandible. They are strong, acrobatic fliers.

Pomarine jaeger, Stercorarius pomarinus (A)
Parasitic jaeger, Stercorarius parasiticus
Long-tailed jaeger, Stercorarius longicaudus (A)

Auks, murres, and puffins
Order: CharadriiformesFamily: Alcidae

Alcids are superficially similar to penguins due to their black-and-white colours, their upright posture, and some of their habits, however they are only distantly related to the penguins and are able to fly. Auks live on the open sea, only deliberately coming ashore to nest.

Black guillemot, Cepphus grylle (A)
Long-billed murrelet, Brachyramphus perdix (A)
Ancient murrelet, Synthliboramphus antiquus (A)

Gulls, terns, and skimmers
Order: CharadriiformesFamily: Laridae

Laridae is a family of medium to large seabirds and includes gulls, terns, kittiwakes, and skimmers. They are typically grey or white, often with black markings on the head or wings. They have stout, longish bills and webbed feet.

Black-legged kittiwake, Rissa tridactyla (A)
Ivory gull, Pagophila eburnea (A)
Sabine's gull, Xema sabini
Bonaparte's gull, Chroicocephalus philadelphia
Black-headed gull, Chroicocephalus ridibundus (A)
Little gull, Hydrocoleus minutus (A)
Ross's gull, Rhodostethia rosea (A)
Franklin's gull, Leucophaeus pipixcan
Short-billed gull, Larus brachyrhynchus
Ring-billed gull, Larus delawarensis
Western gull, Larus occidentalis (A)
California gull, Larus californicus
Herring gull, Larus argentatus
Iceland gull, Larus glaucoides (A)
Lesser black-backed gull, Larus fuscus (A)
Slaty-backed gull, Larus schistisagus (A)
Glaucous-winged gull, Larus glaucescens (A)
Glaucous gull, Larus hyperboreus (A)
Great black-backed gull, Larus marinus (A)
Least tern, Sternula antillarum (A)
Caspian tern, Hydroprogne caspia
Black tern, Chlidonias niger
Common tern, Sterna hirundo
Arctic tern, Sterna paradisaea
Forster's tern, Sterna forsteri

Loons

Order: GaviiformesFamily: Gaviidae

Loons are aquatic birds, the size of a large duck, to which they are unrelated. Their plumage is largely grey or black, and they have spear-shaped bills. Loons swim well and fly adequately, but are almost hopeless on land, because their legs are placed towards the rear of the body.

Red-throated loon, Gavia stellata 
Pacific loon, Gavia pacifica
Common loon, Gavia immer
Yellow-billed loon, Gavia adamsii (A)

Cormorants and shags
Order: SuliformesFamily: Phalacrocoracidae

Cormorants are medium-to-large aquatic birds, usually with mainly dark plumage and areas of coloured skin on the face. The bill is long, thin, and sharply hooked. Their feet are four-toed and webbed.

Double-crested cormorant, Nannopterum auritum

Pelicans
Order: PelecaniformesFamily: Pelecanidae

Pelicans are very large water birds with a distinctive pouch under their beak. Like other birds in the order Pelecaniformes, they have four webbed toes.

American white pelican, Pelecanus erythrorhynchos

Herons, egrets, and bitterns
Order: PelecaniformesFamily: Ardeidae

The family Ardeidae contains the herons, egrets, and bitterns. Herons and egrets are medium to large wading birds with long necks and legs. Bitterns tend to be shorter necked and more secretive. Members of Ardeidae fly with their necks retracted, unlike other long-necked birds such as storks, ibises, and spoonbills.

American bittern, Botaurus lentiginosus
Great blue heron, Ardea herodias
Great egret, Ardea alba
Snowy egret, Egretta thula (A)
Little blue heron, Egretta caerulea (A)
Tricolored heron, Egretta tricolor (A)
Cattle egret, Bubulcus ibis (A)
Green heron, Butorides virescens (A)
Black-crowned night heron, Nycticorax nycticorax
Yellow-crowned night heron, Nyctanassa violacea (A)

Ibises and spoonbills
Order: PelecaniformesFamily: Threskiornithidae

The family Threskiornithidae includes the ibises and spoonbills. They have long, broad wings. Their bodies tend to be elongated, the neck more so, with rather long legs. The bill is also long, decurved in the case of the ibises, straight and distinctively flattened in the spoonbills.

Glossy ibis, Plegadis falcinellus (A)
White-faced ibis, Plegadis chihi

New World vultures
Order: CathartiformesFamily: Cathartidae

The New World vultures are not closely related to Old World vultures, but superficially resemble them because of convergent evolution. Like the Old World vultures, they are scavengers. However, unlike Old World vultures, which find carcasses by sight, New World vultures have a good sense of smell with which they locate carcasses.

Black vulture, Coragyps atratus (A)
Turkey vulture, Cathartes aura
California condor, Gymnogyps californianus extirpated (A)

Osprey
Order: AccipitriformesFamily: Pandionidae

Pandionidae is a family of fish-eating birds of prey possessing a very large, powerful hooked beak for tearing flesh from their prey, strong legs, powerful talons, and keen eyesight. The family is monotypic.

Osprey, Pandion haliaetus

Hawks, eagles, and kites
Order: AccipitriformesFamily: Accipitridae

Accipitridae is a family of birds of prey which includes hawks, eagles, kites, harriers, and Old World vultures. These birds have very large powerful hooked beaks for tearing flesh from their prey, strong legs, powerful talons, and keen eyesight.

Golden eagle, Aquila chrysaetos
Northern harrier, Circus hudsonius
Sharp-shinned hawk, Accipiter striatus
Cooper's hawk, Accipiter cooperii
Northern goshawk, Accipiter gentilis
Bald eagle, Haliaeetus leucocephalus
Broad-winged hawk, Buteo platypterus
Swainson's hawk, Buteo swainsoni
Red-tailed hawk, Buteo jamaicensis
Rough-legged hawk, Buteo lagopus
Ferruginous hawk, Buteo regalis

Barn-owls
Order: StrigiformesFamily: Tytonidae

Owls in the family Tytonidae are medium to large owls with large heads and characteristic heart-shaped faces.

Barn owl, Tyto Alba (A)

Owls
Order: StrigiformesFamily: Strigidae

Typical owls are small to large solitary nocturnal birds of prey. They have large forward-facing eyes and ears, a hawk-like beak, and a conspicuous circle of feathers around each eye called a facial disk.

Flammulated owl, Psiloscops flammeolus (A)
Western screech-owl, Megascops kennicottii (A)
Eastern screech-owl, Megascops asio (A)
Great horned owl, Bubo virginianus
Snowy owl, Bubo scandiacus
Northern hawk owl, Surnia ulula
Northern pygmy-owl, Glaucidium gnoma
Burrowing owl, Athene cunicularia
Barred owl, Strix varia
Great grey owl, Strix nebulosa
Long-eared owl, Asio otus
Short-eared owl, Asio flammeus
Boreal owl, Aegolius funereus
Northern saw-whet owl, Aegolius acadicus

Kingfishers
Order: CoraciiformesFamily: Alcedinidae

Kingfishers are medium-sized birds with large heads, long, pointed bills, short legs, and stubby tails.

Belted kingfisher, Megaceryle alcyon

Woodpeckers
Order: PiciformesFamily: Picidae

Woodpeckers are small to medium-sized birds with chisel-like beaks, short legs, stiff tails, and long tongues used for capturing insects. Some species have feet with two toes pointing forward and two backward, while several species have only three toes. Many woodpeckers have the habit of tapping noisily on tree trunks with their beaks.

Lewis's woodpecker, Melanerpes lewis (A)
Red-headed woodpecker, Melanerpes erythrocephalus (A)
Acorn woodpecker, Melanerpes formicivorus (A)
Red-bellied woodpecker, Melanerpes carolinus (A)
Williamson's sapsucker, Sphyrapicus thyroideus (A)
Yellow-bellied sapsucker, Sphyrapicus varius
Red-naped sapsucker, Sphyrapicus nuchalis
Red-breasted sapsucker, Sphyrapicus ruber (A)
American three-toed woodpecker, Picoides dorsalis
Black-backed woodpecker, Picoides arcticus
Downy woodpecker, Dryobates pubescens
Hairy woodpecker, Dryobates villosus
Northern flicker, Colaptes auratus
Pileated woodpecker, Dryocopus pileatus

Falcons and caracaras
Order: FalconiformesFamily: Falconidae

Falconidae is a family of diurnal birds of prey, notably the falcons and caracaras. They differ from hawks, eagles, and kites in that they kill with their beaks instead of their talons.

Crested caracara, Caracara plancus (A)
American kestrel, Falco sparverius
Merlin, Falco columbarius
Gyrfalcon, Falco rusticolus
Peregrine falcon, Falco peregrinus
Prairie falcon, Falco mexicanus

Tyrant flycatchers
Order: PasseriformesFamily: Tyrannidae

Tyrant flycatchers are Passerine birds which occur throughout North and South America. They superficially resemble the Old World flycatchers, but are more robust and have stronger bills. They do not have the sophisticated vocal capabilities of the songbirds. Most, but not all, are rather plain. As the name implies, most are insectivorous.

Ash-throated flycatcher, Myiarchus cinerascens (A)
Great crested flycatcher, Myiarchus crinitus
Western kingbird, Tyrannus verticalis
Eastern kingbird, Tyrannus tyrannus
Scissor-tailed flycatcher, Tyrannus forficatus (A)
Fork-tailed flycatcher, Tyrannus savana (A)
Olive-sided flycatcher, Contopus cooperi
Western wood-pewee, Contopus sordidulus
Eastern wood-pewee, Contopus virens (A)
Yellow-bellied flycatcher, Empidonax flaviventris
Alder flycatcher, Empidonax alnorum
Willow flycatcher, Empidonax traillii
Least flycatcher, Empidonax minimus
Hammond's flycatcher, Empidonax hammondii
Grey flycatcher, Empidonax wrightii (A)
Dusky flycatcher, Empidonax oberholseri
Pacific-slope flycatcher, Empidonax difficilis 
Cordilleran flycatcher, Empidonax occidentalis (A)
Eastern phoebe, Sayornis phoebe
Say's phoebe, Sayornis saya

Vireos, shrike-babblers, and erpornis
Order: PasseriformesFamily: Vireonidae

The vireos are a group of small to medium-sized passerine birds mostly restricted to the New World, though few other members of the family are found in Asia. They are typically greenish in colour and resemble wood warblers apart from their heavier bills.

White-eyed vireo, Vireo griseus (A)
Yellow-throated vireo, Vireo flavifrons (A)
Cassin's vireo, Vireo cassinii
Blue-headed vireo, Vireo solitarius
Philadelphia vireo, Vireo philadelphicus
Warbling vireo, Vireo gilvus
Red-eyed vireo, Vireo olivaceus

Shrikes
Order: PasseriformesFamily: Laniidae

Shrikes are passerine birds known for their habit of catching other birds and small animals and impaling the uneaten portions of their bodies on thorns. A shrike's beak is hooked, like that of a typical bird of prey.

Loggerhead shrike, Lanius ludovicianus
Northern shrike, Lanius borealis

Crows, jays, and magpies
Order: PasseriformesFamily: Corvidae

The family Corvidae includes crows, ravens, jays, choughs, magpies, treepies, nutcrackers, and ground jays. Corvids are above average in size among the Passeriformes, and some of the larger species show high levels of intelligence.

Canada jay, Perisoreus canadensis
Pinyon jay, Gymnorhinus cyanocephalus (A)
Steller's jay, Cyanocitta stelleri
Blue jay, Cyanocitta cristata
Clark's nutcracker, Nucifraga columbiana
Black-billed magpie, Pica hudsonia
American crow, Corvus brachyrhynchos
Common raven, Corvus corax

Tits, chickadees, and titmice
Order: PasseriformesFamily: Paridae

The Paridae are mainly small stocky woodland species with short stout bills. Some have crests. They are adaptable birds, with a mixed diet including seeds and insects.

Black-capped chickadee, Poecile atricapilla
Mountain chickadee, Poecile gambeli
Chestnut-backed chickadee, Poecile rufescens (A)
Boreal chickadee, Poecile hudsonica

Larks
Order: PasseriformesFamily: Alaudidae

Larks are small terrestrial birds with often extravagant songs and display flights. Most larks are fairly dull in appearance. Their food is insects and seeds.

Horned lark, Eremophila alpestris

Swallows

Order: PasseriformesFamily: Hirundinidae

The family Hirundinidae is adapted to aerial feeding. They have a slender streamlined body, long pointed wings, and a short bill with a wide gape. The feet are adapted to perching rather than walking, and the front toes are partially joined at the base.

Bank swallow, Riparia riparia
Tree swallow, Tachycineta bicolor
Violet-green swallow, Tachycineta thalassina
Northern rough-winged swallow, Stelgidopteryx serripennis
Purple martin, Progne subis
Barn swallow, Hirundo rustica
Cliff swallow, Petrochelidon pyrrhonota

Kinglets
 
Order: PasseriformesFamily: Regulidae

The kinglets are a small family of birds which resemble the titmice. They are very small insectivorous birds. The adults have coloured crowns, giving rise to their name.

Ruby-crowned kinglet, Corthylio calendula
Golden-crowned kinglet, Regulus satrapa

Waxwings
Order: PasseriformesFamily: Bombycillidae

The waxwings are a group of passerine birds with soft silky plumage and unique red tips to some of the wing feathers. In the Bohemian and cedar waxwings, these tips look like sealing wax and give the group its name. These are arboreal birds of northern forests. They live on insects in summer and berries in winter.

Bohemian waxwing, Bombycilla garrulus
Cedar waxwing, Bombycilla cedrorum

Nuthatches
Order: PasseriformesFamily: Sittidae

Nuthatches are small woodland birds. They have the unusual ability to climb down trees head first, unlike other birds which can only go upwards. Nuthatches have big heads, short tails and powerful bills and feet.

Red-breasted nuthatch, Sitta canadensis
White-breasted nuthatch, Sitta carolinensis
Pygmy nuthatch, Sitta pygmaea (A)

Treecreepers
Order: PasseriformesFamily: Certhiidae

Treecreepers are small woodland birds, brown above and white below. They have thin pointed down-curved bills, which they use to extricate insects from bark. They have stiff tail feathers, like woodpeckers, which they use to support themselves on vertical trees.

Brown creeper, Certhia americana

Gnatcatchers
Order: PasseriformesFamily: Polioptilidae

These dainty birds resemble Old World warblers in their structure and habits, moving restlessly through the foliage seeking insects. The gnatcatchers are mainly soft bluish grey in colour and have the typical insectivore's long sharp bill. Many species have distinctive black head patterns (especially males) and long, regularly cocked, black-and-white tails.

Blue-grey gnatcatcher, Polioptila caerulea (A)

Wrens

Order: PasseriformesFamily: Troglodytidae

Wrens are small and inconspicuous birds, except for their loud songs. They have short wings and thin down-turned bills. Several species often hold their tails upright. All are insectivorous.

Rock wren, Salpinctes obsoletus
House wren, Troglodytes aedon
Pacific wren, Troglodytes pacificus
Winter wren, Troglodytes hiemalis
Sedge wren, Cistothorus platensis
Marsh wren, Cistothorus palustris
Carolina wren, Thryothorus ludovicianus (A)

Mockingbirds and thrashers
Order: PasseriformesFamily: Mimidae

The mimids are a family of passerine birds which includes thrashers, mockingbirds, tremblers, and the New World catbirds. These birds are notable for their vocalization, especially their remarkable ability to mimic a wide variety of birds and other sounds heard outdoors. The species tend towards dull greys and browns in their appearance.

Grey catbird, Dumetella carolinensis
Curve-billed thrasher, Toxostoma curvirostre (A)
Brown thrasher, Toxostoma rufum
Bendire's thrasher, Toxostoma bendirei (A)
Sage thrasher, Oreoscoptes montanus
Northern mockingbird, Mimus polyglottos (A)

Starlings
Order: PasseriformesFamily: Sturnidae

Starlings and mynas are small to medium-sized Old World passerine birds with strong feet. Their flight is strong and direct and most are very gregarious. Their preferred habitat is fairly open country, and they eat insects and fruit. The plumage of several species is dark with a metallic sheen.

European starling, Sturnus vulgaris (I)

Dippers
Order: PasseriformesFamily: Cinclidae

Dippers are a group of perching birds whose habitat includes aquatic environments in the Americas, Europe and Asia. They are named for their bobbing or dipping movements. These birds have adaptations which allows them to submerge and walk on the bottom to feed on insect larvae.

American dipper, Cinclus mexicanus

Thrushes and allies
Order: PasseriformesFamily: Turdidae

The thrushes are a group of passerine birds that occur mainly but not exclusively in the Old World. They are plump, soft plumaged, small to medium-sized insectivores or sometimes omnivores, often feeding on the ground. Many have attractive songs.

Eastern bluebird, Sialia sialis (A)
Western bluebird, Sialia mexicana (A)
Mountain bluebird, Sialia currucoides
Townsend's solitaire, Myadestes townsendi
Veery, Catharus fuscescens
Grey-cheeked thrush, Catharus minimus
Swainson's thrush, Catharus ustulatus
Hermit thrush, Catharus guttatus
Wood thrush, Hylocichla mustelina (A)
American robin, Turdus migratorius
Varied thrush, Ixoreus naevius

Old World flycatchers
Order: PasseriformesFamily: Muscicapidae

The Old World flycatchers is a large family of small passerine birds. These are mainly small arboreal insectivores, many of which, as the name implies, take their prey on the wing.

Northern wheatear, Oenanthe oenanthe (A)

Accentors
Order: PasseriformesFamily: Prunellidae

Accentors are small, fairly drab species superficially similar, but unrelated to, sparrows. However, accentors have thin sharp bills, reflecting their diet of insects in summer, augmented with seeds and berries in winter.

Siberian accentor, Prunella montanella (A)

Old World sparrows
Order: PasseriformesFamily: Passeridae

Old World sparrows are small passerine birds. In general, sparrows tend to be small plump brownish or greyish birds with short tails and short powerful beaks. Sparrows are seed eaters, but they also consume small insects.

House sparrow, Passer domesticus (I)
Eurasian tree sparrow, Passer montanus (I)(A)

Wagtails and pipits
Order: PasseriformesFamily: Motacillidae

Motacillidae is a family of small passerine birds with medium to long tails. They include the wagtails, longclaws, and pipits. They are slender ground-feeding insectivores of open country.

Eastern yellow wagtail, Motacilla tschutschensis (A)
American pipit, Anthus rubescens
Sprague's pipit, Anthus spragueii

Finches, euphonias, and allies
Order: PasseriformesFamily: Fringillidae

Finches are seed-eating passerine birds, that are small to moderately large and have a strong beak, usually conical and in some species very large. All have twelve tail feathers and nine primaries. These birds have a bouncing flight with alternating bouts of flapping and gliding on closed wings, and most sing well.

Brambling, Fringilla montifringilla (A)
Evening grosbeak, Coccothraustes vespertinus
Pine grosbeak, Pinicola enucleator
Grey-crowned rosy-finch, Leucosticte tephrocotis
House finch, Haemorhous mexicanus
Purple finch, Haemorhous purpureus
Cassin's finch, Haemorhous cassinii
Common redpoll, Acanthis flammea
Hoary redpoll, Acanthis hornemanni
Red crossbill, Loxia curvirostra
White-winged crossbill, Loxia leucoptera
Pine siskin, Spinus pinus
Lesser goldfinch, Spinus psaltria (A)
American goldfinch, Spinus tristis

Longspurs and snow buntings
Order: PasseriformesFamily: Calcariidae

The Calcariidae are a group of passerine birds that were traditionally grouped with the New World sparrows, but differ in a number of respects and are usually found in open grassy areas.

Lapland longspur, Calcarius lapponicus
Chestnut-collared longspur, Calcarius ornatus
Smith's longspur, Calcarius pictus
Thick-billed longspur, Rhyncophanes mccownii
Snow bunting, Plectrophenax nivalis

New World sparrows

Order: PasseriformesFamily: Passerellidae

Until 2017, these species were considered part of the family Emberizidae. Most of the species are known as sparrows, but these birds are not closely related to the Old World sparrows which are in the family Passeridae. Many of these have distinctive head patterns.

Cassin's sparrow, Peucaea cassinii (A)
Grasshopper sparrow, Ammodramus savannarum
Black-throated sparrow, Amphispiza bilineata (A)
Lark sparrow, Chondestes grammacus
Lark bunting, Calamospiza melanocorys
Chipping sparrow, Spizella passerina
Clay-coloured sparrow, Spizella pallida
Field sparrow, Spizella pusilla (A)
Brewer's sparrow, Spizella breweri
Fox sparrow, Passerella iliaca
American tree sparrow, Spizelloides arborea
Dark-eyed junco, Junco hyemalis
White-crowned sparrow, Zonotrichia leucophrys
Golden-crowned sparrow, Zonotrichia atricapilla
Harris's sparrow, Zonotrichia querula
White-throated sparrow, Zonotrichia albicollis
Sagebrush sparrow, Artemisiospiza nevadensis (A)
Vesper sparrow, Pooecetes gramineus
LeConte's sparrow, Ammospiza leconteii
Nelson's sparrow, Ammospiza nelsoni
Baird's sparrow, Centronyx bairdii
Savannah sparrow, Passerculus sandwichensis
Song sparrow, Melospiza melodia
Lincoln's sparrow, Melospiza lincolnii
Swamp sparrow, Melospiza georgiana
Green-tailed towhee, Pipilo chlorurus (A)
Spotted towhee, Pipilo maculatus
Eastern towhee, Pipilo erythrophthalmus (A)

Yellow-breasted chat
Order: PasseriformesFamily: Icteriidae

This species was historically placed in the wood-warblers (Parulidae) but nonetheless most authorities were unsure if it belonged there. It was placed in its own family in 2017.

Yellow-breasted chat, Icteria virens

Troupials and allies
Order: PasseriformesFamily: Icteridae

The icterids are a group of small to medium-sized, often colourful passerine birds restricted to the New World and include the grackles, New World blackbirds, and New World orioles. Most species have black as a predominant plumage colour, often enlivened by yellow, orange, or red.

Yellow-headed blackbird, Xanthocephalus xanthocephalus
Bobolink, Dolichonyx oryzivorus
Eastern meadowlark, Sturnella magna (A)
Western meadowlark, Sturnella neglecta
Orchard oriole, Icterus spurius
Bullock's oriole, Icterus bullockii
Baltimore oriole, Icterus galbula
Red-winged blackbird, Agelaius phoeniceus
Brown-headed cowbird, Molothrus ater
Rusty blackbird, Euphagus carolinus
Brewer's blackbird, Euphagus cyanocephalus
Common grackle, Quiscalus quiscula
Great-tailed grackle, Quiscalus mexicanus (A)

New World warblers
Order: PasseriformesFamily: Parulidae

The New world warblers are a group of small often colourful passerine birds restricted to the New World. Most are arboreal, but some are more terrestrial. Most members of this family are insectivores.

Ovenbird, Seiurus aurocapilla
Northern waterthrush, Parkesia noveboracensis
Golden-winged warbler, Vermivora chrysoptera (A)
Blue-winged warbler, Vermivora cyanoptera (A)
Black-and-white warbler, Mniotilta varia
Prothonotary warbler, Protonotaria citrea (A)
Tennessee warbler, Leiothlypis peregrina
Orange-crowned warbler, Leiothlypis celata
Lucy's warbler, Leiothlypis luciae (A)
Nashville warbler, Leiothlypis ruficapilla (A)
Connecticut warbler, Oporornis agilis
MacGillivray's warbler, Geothlypis tolmiei
Mourning warbler, Geothlypis philadelphia
Kentucky warbler, Geothlypis formosa (A)
Common yellowthroat, Geothlypis trichas
Hooded warbler, Setophaga citrina (A)
American redstart, Setophaga ruticilla
Cape May warbler, Setophaga tigrina
Northern parula, Setophaga americana (A)
Magnolia warbler, Setophaga magnolia
Bay-breasted warbler, Setophaga castanea
Blackburnian warbler, Setophaga fusca
Yellow warbler, Setophaga petechia
Chestnut-sided warbler, Setophaga pensylvanica
Blackpoll warbler, Setophaga striata
Black-throated blue warbler, Setophaga caerulescens (A)
Palm warbler, Setophaga palmarum
Pine warbler, Setophaga pinus (A)
Yellow-rumped warbler, Setophaga coronata
Yellow-throated warbler, Setophaga dominica (A)
Black-throated grey warbler, Setophaga nigrescens (A)
Townsend's warbler, Setophaga townsendi
Hermit warbler, Setophaga occidentalis (A)
Black-throated green warbler, Setophaga virens
Canada warbler, Cardellina canadensis
Wilson's warbler, Cardellina pusilla

Cardinals and allies
Order: PasseriformesFamily: Cardinalidae

The cardinals are a family of robust, seed-eating birds with strong bills. They are typically associated with open woodland. The sexes usually have distinct plumages.

Summer tanager, Piranga rubra (A)
Scarlet tanager, Piranga olivacea (A)
Western tanager, Piranga ludoviciana
Northern cardinal, Cardinalis cardinalis
Rose-breasted grosbeak, Pheucticus ludovicianus
Black-headed grosbeak, Pheucticus melanocephalus
Blue grosbeak, Passerina caerulea (A)
Lazuli bunting, Passerina amoena
Indigo bunting, Passerina cyanea (A)
Painted bunting, Passerina ciris (A)
Dickcissel, Spiza americana (A)

Notes

References

Birds
Alberta